The 1944 Saskatchewan general election was held on June 15, 1944 to elect members of the Legislative Assembly of Saskatchewan.

The election was held six years after the previous election.  There is normally a five-year limit on the lifespan of Parliaments and provincial assemblies in Canada, but the emergency brought on by the Second World War allowed the government to delay the election temporarily.

It marked the first time a socialist government was elected anywhere in Canada. Co-operative Commonwealth Federation (CCF) leader Tommy Douglas became the premier of the province.

The CCF won 47 of the 52 seats in the legislature, and over half the popular vote, despite a very negative campaign by the governing Liberal Party. The Liberals, led by William John Patterson, accused Douglas of being a communist.

The Liberal popular vote fell by 10 percentage points, and they won only five seats. It is still the worst defeat of a sitting government in Saskatchewan's history.

The Social Credit Party of Saskatchewan, which had won 16% of the vote and two seats in the 1938 election, collapsed; the party had only one candidate, who won only 249 votes.

The Communist Party-led Unity movement reverted to the name Labor-Progressive Party, and lost both of the seats it had won in 1938.

The Conservative Party, renamed the Progressive Conservative Party of Saskatchewan and led by Rupert Ramsay,  won over 10% of the vote, but no seats.

An at-large service vote was held for Saskatchewan residents in the Canadian armed services fighting during World War II. This special vote elected three nonpartisan members to represent Saskatchewan soldiers, sailors and airmen stationed in 1.) Great Britain, 2.) the Mediterranean region and 3.) Newfoundland and Canada outside the province. Alberta had a similar system during the war.

Results

Note: * Party did not nominate candidates in previous election.

Percentages

Ranking

Riding-by-riding results
Names in bold represent cabinet ministers and the Speaker. Party leaders are italicized. The symbol " ** " indicates MLAs who are not running again.

Northwestern Saskatchewan

|-
|bgcolor=whitesmoke|Athabasca
|
|Pierre Ephrem Ayotte57
|| 
|Louis Marcien Marion626
|
|Alexander Fred De Laronde9
|
|Errick Guttormur Erickson (Ind.) 78
Francis Xavier Poitras (Ind. Liberal) 5
|| 
|Hubert Staines**
|-
|bgcolor=whitesmoke|Cut Knife
|| 
|Isidore Charles Nollet2726
|
|John A. Gordon1820
|
|
|
|
|| 
|William Roseland**
|-
|bgcolor=whitesmoke|Meadow Lake
|| 
|Herschel Lee Howell2034
|
|Donald MacDonald1805
|
|William Titley362
|
|Arthur J. Doucet (Labor-Progressive) 716
|| 
|Donald MacDonald
|-
|bgcolor=whitesmoke|Redberry
|| 
|Dmytro Matthew Lazorko2306
|
|Wilfred James Langley1285
|
|Ernest Wilson662
|
|Peter John Semko (Ind.) 99
|| 
|Orest Zerebko**
|-
|bgcolor=whitesmoke|Rosthern
|
|Henry Begrand1541
|| 
|Peter J. Hooge2199
|
|Gordon Ellis Goble473
|
|
|| 
|John Michael Uhrich**
|-
|bgcolor=whitesmoke|Shellbrook
|| 
|Albert Victor Sterling3310
|
|Omer Demers2177
|
|
|
|
|| 
|Omer Alphonse Demers
|-
|bgcolor=whitesmoke|The Battlefords
|| 
|Alexander Duff Connon2783
|
|Paul Prince2426
|
|Robert Wendell McNair446
|
|
|| 
|Paul Prince
|-
|bgcolor=whitesmoke|Turtleford
|| 
|Bob Wooff2506
|
|William Franklin Kerr1766
|
|Chester Hicks399
|
|
|| 
|William Franklin Kerr

Northeastern Saskatchewan

|-
|bgcolor=whitesmoke|Cumberland
|| 
|Leslie Walter Lee357
|
|Deakin Alexander Hall242
|
|Raoul Olier St. Denis11
|
|
|| 
|Deakin Alexander Hall
|-
|bgcolor=whitesmoke|Humboldt
|| 
|Ben Putnam3587
|
|Arnold William Loehr2673
|
|Stephen David Weese358
|
|
|| 
|Joseph William Burton**
|-
|bgcolor=whitesmoke|Kelvington
|| 
|Peter Anton Howe3132
|
|Gladstone Mansfield Ferrie1880
|
|Samuel Edward Hall649
|
|
|| 
|Peter Anton Howe
|-
|bgcolor=whitesmoke|Kinistino
|| 
|William James Boyle3055
|
|Russell Martin Paul1544
|
|Andrew Fraser671
|
|
|| 
|John Richard Parish Taylor**
|-
|bgcolor=whitesmoke|Melfort
|| 
|Oakland Woods Valleau3396
|
|John Duncan MacFarlane1862
|
|Stanley Beattie Caskey1450
|
|
|| 
|Oakland Woods Valleau
|-
|bgcolor=whitesmoke|Prince Albert
|| 
|Lachlan Fraser McIntosh6178
|
|Harold John Fraser3617
|
|Edgar Percy Woodman655
|
|
|| 
|Harold John Fraser
|-
|bgcolor=whitesmoke|Tisdale
|| 
|John Hewgill Brockelbank5283
|
|Clarence Railsback O'Connor2269
|
|Isaac Flexman Stothers703
|
|
|| 
|John Hewgill Brockelbank
|-
|bgcolor=whitesmoke|Torch River
|| 
|John Bruce Harris2609
|
|Donald L. Menzies846
|
|Keith Acton Baldwin535
|
|
|| 
|James Archibald Kiteley**

West Central Saskatchewan

|-
|bgcolor=whitesmoke|Arm River
|
|William R. Fansher 2256
|| 
|Gustaf Herman Danielson2343
|
|Thomas Alfred Homersham 1068
|
|
|| 
|Gustaf Herman Danielson
|-
|bgcolor=whitesmoke|Biggar
|| 
|Woodrow Stanley Lloyd 3633
|
|Frank Freeman 2156
|
|
|
|
|| 
|John Allan Young**
|-
|bgcolor=whitesmoke|Hanley
|| 
|James Smith Aitken2272
|
|Charles Agar1775
|
|James Hubert Cannon893
|
|
|| 
|Charles Agar
|-
|bgcolor=whitesmoke|Kerrobert-Kindersley
|| 
|John Wellbelove3236
|
|Donald Laing2377
|
|Wellington Smith Myers933
|
|
|| 
|Donald Laing
|-
|bgcolor=whitesmoke|Rosetown
|| 
|John Taylor Douglas3168
|
|William Leith1864
|
|John Wilbert Stewart1046
|
|
|| 
|Neil McVicar**
|-
|bgcolor=whitesmoke|Watrous
|| 
|James Andrew Darling3801
|
|Frank Stephen Krenn2312
|
|Hugh Smith749
|
|
|| 
|Frank Stephen Krenn
|-
|bgcolor=whitesmoke|Wilkie
|| 
|Hans Ove Hansen3567
|
|John Cunningham Knowles2527
|
|
|
|
|| 
|John Cunningham Knowles

East Central Saskatchewan

|-
|bgcolor=whitesmoke|Canora
|| 
|Myron Henry Feeley3538
|
|Stephen T. Shabbits2537
|
|
|
|
|| 
|Myron Henry Feeley
|-
|bgcolor=whitesmoke|Last Mountain
|| 
|Jacob Benson3803
|
|Henry Philip Mang2064
|
|James Lindsay Blair1281
|
|
|| 
|Jacob Benson
|-
|bgcolor=whitesmoke|Melville
|| 
|William James Arthurs4575
|
|Lionel Stilborn3614
|
|Shamus Patrick Regan821
|
|
|| 
|John Frederick Herman**
|-
|bgcolor=whitesmoke|Pelly
|| 
|Dan Daniels3273
|
|Reginald John Marsden Parker2544
|
|
|
|William Michael Berezowski(Labor-Progressive) 554
|| 
|Reginald John Marsden Parker
|-
|bgcolor=whitesmoke|Saltcoats
|| 
|Joseph Lee Phelps3461
|
|Donald Alexander MacKenzie2874
|
|Rae Melville Salkeld454
|
|
|| 
|Joseph Lee Phelps
|-
|bgcolor=whitesmoke|Touchwood
|| 
|Tom Johnston3337
|
|John Joseph Collins1925
|
|William Seneshen301
|
|
|| 
|Tom Johnston
|-
|bgcolor=whitesmoke|Wadena
|| 
|George Hara Williams4162
|
|George Russell Cook1686
|
|
|
|Walter Elvy Rogers (Ind.) 207
|| 
|George Hara Williams
|-
|bgcolor=whitesmoke|Yorkton
|| 
|Arthur Percy Swallow3887
|
|Alfred Ariel Brown2280
|
|Norman Roebuck958
|
|
|| 
|Alan Carl Stewart** (Unity)

Southwest Saskatchewan

|-
|bgcolor=whitesmoke|Elrose
|| 
|Maurice John Willis3771
|
|Hubert Staines1807
|
|Ernest J. Ewing1013
|
|
|| 
|Louis Henry Hantelman**
|-
|bgcolor=whitesmoke|Gravelbourg
|| 
|Henry Edmund Houze2681
|
|Edward M. Culliton2586
|
|
|
|
|| 
|Edward Milton Culliton
|-
|bgcolor=whitesmoke|Gull Lake
|| 
|Alvin Cecil Murray3942
|
|Harvey Harold McMahon2200
|
|Charles Howard Howlett1356
|
|
|| 
|Harvey Harold McMahon
|-
|bgcolor=whitesmoke|Maple Creek
|| 
|Beatrice Janet Trew3656
|
|John Joseph Mildenberger2872
|
|George Chester Stewart911
|
|
|| 
|John Joseph Mildenberger
|-
|bgcolor=whitesmoke|Morse
|| 
|Sidney Merlin Spidell2763
|
|Benjamin Thomas Hyde2122
|
|Clifford Bruce Martin725
|
|
|| 
|Benjamin Thomas Hyde
|-
|bgcolor=whitesmoke|
|| 
|Niles Leonard Buchanan4176
|
|Charles William Johnson2862
|
|
|
|
|| 
|Charles William Johnson
|-
|bgcolor=whitesmoke|Swift Current
|| 
|Harry Gibbs4756
|
|James Gordon Taggart3123
|
|Bryan Maxwell Hill1021
|
|
|| 
|James Gordon Taggart

Southeast Saskatchewan

|-
|bgcolor=whitesmoke|Bengough
|| 
|Allan Lister Samuel Brown3847
|
|Thomas Waddell2473
|
|
|
|
|| 
|Herman Kersler Warren** (Unity)
|-
|bgcolor=whitesmoke|Cannington
|
|Gladys Strum3204
|| 
|William John Patterson3210
|
|William Armstrong Brigden687
|
|
|| 
|William John Patterson
|-
|bgcolor=whitesmoke|Lumsden
|| 
|William Sancho Thair2966
|
|James Gallagher Knox1887
|
|Arthur Maurice Pearson1220
|
|
|| 
|Robert Scott Donaldson**
|-
|bgcolor=whitesmoke|Milestone
|| 
|Frank Keem Malcolm3302
|
|William Pedersen2207
|
|
|
|
|| 
|William Pedersen
|-
|bgcolor=whitesmoke|Moosomin
|
|David Alexander Cunningham3324
|| 
|Arthur Thomas Procter3865
|
|
|
|
|| 
|Arthur Thomas Procter
|-
|bgcolor=whitesmoke|Qu'Appelle-Wolseley
|| 
|Warden Burgess4339
|
|Frederick Middleton Dundas3314
|
|William Herman Acres938
|
|
|| 
|Frederick Middleton Dundas
|-
|bgcolor=whitesmoke|Souris-Estevan
|| 
|Charles David Cuming3933
|
|Norman Leslie McLeod2660
|
|Herbert Samuel Penny1259
|
|
|| 
|Norman Leslie McLeod
|-
|bgcolor=whitesmoke|Weyburn
|| 
|Thomas Clement Douglas5605
|
|James Weyburn Adolphe3489
|
|
|
|
|| 
|George Levi Crane**

Urban constituencies

|-
|bgcolor=whitesmoke|Moose Jaw City
|| 
|John Wesley Corman6296
Dempster Henry Ratcliffe Heming5894
|
|William George Baker2881
Harold Walpole Pope2887
|
|Russell Lawrence Brownridge1271
Hugh Alexander Tiers1036
|
|Frank Ernest Talbot (Social Credit) 249
|| 
|William Gladstone Ross**
William George Baker
|-
|bgcolor=whitesmoke|Saskatoon City
|| 
|John Henry Sturdy9375
Arthur Thomas Stone7792
|
|James Wilfred Estey5084
Robert Mitford Pinder3924
|
|Rupert David Ramsay5368
Henry Oswald Wright3171
|
|Frederick Nelson Clarke(Labor-Progressive) 797

Russell Hartney (Ind.) 200

John Harrison Hilton (Ind.) 121
|| 
|Robert Mitford Pinder
James Wilfred Estey
|-
|bgcolor=whitesmoke|Regina City
|| 
|Clarence Melvin Fines14129
Charles Cromwell Williams14784
|
|Charles Roberts Davidson10982
Bernard J. McDaniel10551
|
|Hugh McGillivray3536
Claude Henry James Burrows3114
|
|
|| 
|Bernard J. McDaniel
Percy McCuaig Anderson**

By-elections

|-

| style="width: 130px" |CCF
|Guy Franklin Van Eaton
|align="right"|3,350
|align="right"|53.1
|align="right"|-7.3
|-

|Liberal
|Harold Keith Elder
|align="right"|2,514
|align="right"|42.9
|align="right"|+3.2
|-

|Social Credit
|Albert M. Courchene
|align="right"|450
|align="right"|15.2
|align="right"|-
|-
|- bgcolor="white"
!align="left" colspan=3|Total
!align="right"|6,314
!align="right"|
!align="right"|

|-

| style="width: 130px" |CCF
|Frederick Arthur Dewhurst
|align="right"|2,474
|align="right"|80.9
|align="right"|+12.2
|-

|Labor-Progressive
|William Beeching
|align="right"|584
|align="right"|19.1
|align="right"|-
|-
|- bgcolor="white"
!align="left" colspan=3|Total
!align="right"|3,085
!align="right"|
!align="right"|

|-

| style="width: 130px" |CCF
|James William Gibson
|align="right"|3,006
|align="right"|46.1
|align="right"|-3.1
|-

|Liberal
|Herbert Wiebe
|align="right"|2,410
|align="right"|37.0
|align="right"|-0.8
|-

|Progressive Conservative
|Rupert Ramsay
|align="right"|1,098
|align="right"|16.9
|align="right"|+3.9
|-
|- bgcolor="white"
!align="left" colspan=3|Total
!align="right"|6,514
!align="right"|
!align="right"|

1944 service elections
Active Service Voters, Saskatchewan members of the Canadian armed services on active duty outside of Saskatchewan, were polled between October 17 and October 30, 1944. One representative was elected from each of three areas. These candidates did not specify any party affiliation.

Area 1 (Great Britain)

Area 2 (Mediterranean Theatre)

Area 3 (Canada outside of Saskatchewan/Newfoundland)

Further reading

See also
List of Saskatchewan political parties
List of Saskatchewan provincial electoral districts

References
Saskatchewan Election Results By Electoral Division
Elections Saskatchewan: Previous Elections

External links
Saskatchewan Election Results By Electoral Division
Elections Saskatchewan: Provincial Vote Summaries
Saskatchewan's 1944 CCF Election

1944 elections in Canada
1944 in Saskatchewan
1944
June 1944 events